Grit Haid (born Margarete Haid, 14 March 1900 – 13 August 1938) was an Austrian stage and film actress. She was the younger sister of the actress Liane Haid. She died in a plane crash in 1938.

Selected filmography
 Don Cesar, Count of Irun (1918)
 Emperor Charles (1921) 
 The Daughter of the Brigadier (1922)
 The Marquise of Clermont (1922)
 The Ghost of Morton's Castle (1922)
 Tales of Old Vienna (1923)
 The Hell of Barballo (1923)
 The Three Mannequins (1926)
 People to Each Other (1926)
 We Belong to the Imperial-Royal Infantry Regiment (1926)
 Young Blood (1926)
 Marie's Soldier (1927)
 Carnival Magic (1927)
 Rinaldo Rinaldini (1927)
 A Girl with Temperament (1928)
 Eddy Polo in the Wasp's Nest (1928)
 Suzy Saxophone (1928)
 Give Me Life (1928)
 From a Bachelor's Diary (1929)
 His Best Friend (1929)
 Andreas Hofer (1929)
 Marriage in Name Only (1930)
 Reckless Youth (1931)
 Gypsy Blood (1934)

References

Bibliography
 Jennifer M. Kapczynski & Michael D. Richardson. A New History of German Cinema.

External links

1900 births
1938 deaths
Austrian film actresses
Austrian silent film actresses
20th-century Austrian actresses
Actresses from Vienna
Victims of aviation accidents or incidents in Germany
Victims of aviation accidents or incidents in 1938